Chrysocentris chrysozona is a moth in the  family Glyphipterigidae. It is from South Africa.

The wingspan is about 18 mm. The forewings are pale brownish-ochreous, the basal two-fifths suffused with grey and with a median transverse golden-metallic line, as well as four small indistinct pale ochreous spots on the posterior part of the costa, margined with rather dark grey anteriorly, the first three tipped with golden-metallic dots, the fourth giving rise to a golden-metallic subterminal streak reaching half across the wing. There is a triangular greyish blotch in the disc posteriorly, the apex anterior, crossed by several whitish longitudinal lines on the veins, and edged above by three small golden-metallic spots, of which the third is confluent with the third subcostal dot, and beneath by a black band marked with a row of four raised golden-metallic spots and also with whitish lines on vein 3 between these spots and vein 2 beneath them. A golden-metallic marginal streak is found around the apex and termen to this band. The hindwings are rather dark grey.

References

Endemic moths of South Africa
Glyphipterigidae
Moths of Africa
Moths described in 1921